The Canadian Paralympic Committee (CPC; French: Comité paralympique canadien) is the private, non-profit organization representing Canadian Paralympic athletes in the International Paralympic Committee (IPC) and the Parapan American Games. It represents 25 member sports organisations. The CPC's vision is to be the world's leading Paralympic nation. Its mission is to lead the development of a sustainable Paralympic sport system in Canada to enable athletes to reach the podium at the Paralympic Games. By supporting Canadian high performance athletes with a disability and promoting their success, the Canadian Paralympic Committee inspires all Canadians with a disability to get involved in sport through programs delivered by its member organizations.

Members

Active
 Alpine Canada Alpin
 Athletics Canada
 Canadian Blind Sport Association
 Canadian Cerebral Palsy Sports Association
 Canadian Curling Association
 Canadian Cycling Association
 Canadian Fencing Federation
 Canadian Soccer Association
 Canadian Wheelchair Basketball Association - now known as Wheelchair Basketball Canada (http://www.wheelchairbasketball.ca/)
 Canadian Wheelchair Sports Association
 Canadian Yachting Association
 Cross Country Canada
 Equine Canada
 Federation of Canadian Archers
 Hockey Canada
 Judo Canada
 Rowing Canada Aviron
 Shooting Federation of Canada
 Swimming Natation Canada
 Table Tennis Canada
 Tennis Canada
 Volleyball Canada

Affiliate
 Active Living Alliance for Canadians with a Disability
 Alter Go
 Badminton Canada
 BC Disability Sports
 Bobsleigh Canada Skeleton
 Canadian Amateur DanceSport Association
 Canadian Amputee Sports Association
 Canadian Association for Disabled Skiing
 Canadian Association of Athletes with an Intellectual Disability
 Canadian Forces Personnel and Family Support Agency
 Canadian Snowboard Federation
 CanoeKayak Canada
 Field Hockey Canada
 Gymnastics Canada
 Ontario Para Network
 ParaSport Ontario
 Parasport and Recreation PEI
 Synchro Canada
 Taekwondo Canada
 Triathlon Canada
 Water Ski and Wakeboard Canada

Presidents
List of past presidents:

 Lou Lefaive (1976–1977)
 Hugh Glynn (1977–1981)
 Doug Allen (1982–1983)
 Robert Steadward (1984–1990)
 Helen Manning (1991–1997)
 Laurel Crosby (1997–1998)
 Patrick Jarvis (1998–2006)
 Henry Wohler (interim, 2006)
 Carla Qualtrough (2006–2011)
 David Legg (2011–2013)
 Gaétan Tardif (2013–2017)

Hall of Fame
 Athletes
 Arnold Boldt (2001)
 Eugene Reimer (2001)
 Joanne Berdan (2003)
 André Viger (2005)
 Michael Edgson (2011)
 Clayton Gerein (2011)
 Ljiljana Ljubisic (2011)
 Robert Easton (2013)
 Jennifer Krempien (2013)
 Tim McIsaac (2013)
 Chantal Petitclerc (2015)
 Lauren Woolstencroft (2015)
 Marni Abbott-Peter (2015)
 Karolina Wisniewska (2017)
 Colette Bourgonje (2019)
 Josh Dueck (2019)
 Viviane Forest (2019)
 Joey Johnson (2019)
 Garett Hickling (2019)

 Coaches
 Earl Church (2011)
 Tim Frick (2013)
 Wilf Strom (2015)
 Ozzie Sawicki (2017)
 Joe Rea (2019)

 Builders
 Robert Steadward (2000)
 Robert W. Jackson (2001)
 Rick Hansen (2003)
 Jerry Johnston (2003)
 Duncan Campbell (2005)
 Patrick Jarvis (2007)
 Joyce Fairbairn (2011)
 Janet Dunn (2013)
 John Howe (2013)
 Audrey Strom (2015)
 Gary McPherson (2015)
 Dr. Donald Royer (2015)
 Carla Qualtrough (2017)
 Archie Allison (2017)
 Maureen Orchard (2017)
 Kathy Newman (2019)

Source:

See also
 Canadian Olympic Committee
 Canada at the Paralympics

References

External links

 Official site

Canadian Paralympics
Para
Parasports organizations
National Paralympic Committees
Disability organizations based in Canada